Dyce RFC is a rugby union club based in Dyce, Aberdeen, Scotland.

History

The club was founded in 1983. Atholl Garden, Steve Holmes and Gus McVey combined to start the club:- Atholl Garden was a Physical Education teacher at Dyce Academy; Steve Holmes a Financial Director of Loffland Brothers; and Gus McVey was the Manager of the local Bank of Scotland branch in Dyce. Gus McVey unfortunately died in 2019, aged 76.

The club had a short stint at Westhill but now play in the town of Dyce. Dyce don't as yet have their own clubhouse; and their home matches take place on the council run pitches behind the local Asda supermarket.
Keiran Esson is considered to be the best ever player to play for Dyce RFC, scoring a sublime try against Ellon 2XV.
The club actively use snap sponsorship to recruit club sponsors.

The club has its own tartan, which was commissioned and designed to celebrate its 35th anniversary.

Sides

Dyce train every Tuesday and Thursday nights from 6.30pm to 8pm.

Honours

Mens

 Caledonia Bowl
 Champions (1): 2010-11

References

Rugby union in Aberdeen
Scottish rugby union teams